INX may refer to:

• I -illuminate  N- nominee  X - Xavier(means bright in Germany language)

 INX Network, the original name of 9X Media, headquartered in Mumbai, India
 INX News, now known as NewsX
 INX, the ICAO airline designator for Inter Airlines, a former Turkish airline
 INX or InDesign Interchange, an older file format for Adobe InDesign software
 Prelude INX, a Honda car model introduced for the Japanese domestic market in 1989

See also 

 INXS